Ernst Vilhelm Østrup (21 September 1845, in Roskilde – 16 April 1917, in Frederiksberg) was a Danish botanist and phycologist, mainly working on diatoms.

In 1873 he received his cand. polyt. degree, and later worked as a schoolteacher in Copenhagen. His diatom research largely dealt with species found in Denmark, Greenland, Iceland, Faeroe Islands and Jan Mayen.

The diatom genus Oestrupia (Heiden) and the species Diploneis oestrupii (Hust.), Surirella oestrupii (Gran) and Navicula oestrupii (Cleve) are all named in his honour.

Selected scientific works 
 Ferskvands-Diatoméer fra Øst-Grønland. Meddelelser om Grønland 15: 251–290. 1898.
 Beiträge zur Kenntnis der Diatomeenflora des Kossogolbeckens in der nordwestlichen Mongolei. Hedwigia 48 (1-2): 74–100. 1909.
 Danske Diatoméer. C.A. Reitzel, København. 323 pp. (1910) 
 Diatoms from North-east Greenland (N of 76 N.Lat.) collected by the Denmark Expedition. Meddelelser om Grønland 43 (10): 193–256. 1910.
 Diatomaceæ ex insulis Danicis Indiæ Occidentalis imprimis a F. Børgesen lectæ. Dansk Botanisk Arkiv vol. 1 (1): 1-29. (1913) 
Marine diatoms from the coasts of Iceland. The Botany of Iceland, edited by L. Kolderup Rosenvinge & E. Warming, J. Frimodt, Copenhagen, and John Wheldon and Co., London; Vol. 1, Part 2, pp. 345–394. 1916.
Fresh-water diatoms from Iceland. The Botany of Iceland, edited by L. Kolderup Rosenvinge & E. Warming, J. Frimodt, Copenhagen, and John Wheldon and Co., London; Vol. 2, Part 1, pp. 1–100. 1918.

References

External links 
 A list of 192 diatom names by Ernst Østrup or which are linked to Østrup's taxa

1845 births
1917 deaths
19th-century Danish botanists
Danish phycologists
People from Roskilde
20th-century Danish botanists